Aleksander Jan Cichoń (born 9 December 1958 in Rzeszów) is a Polish wrestler who competed in the 1980 Summer Olympics.

He was a bronze medalist in wrestling at the 1980 Summer Olympics in the freestyle 90 kg category (light-heavyweight).

References

External links 
 
 
 
 

1958 births
Living people
Olympic wrestlers of Poland
Wrestlers at the 1980 Summer Olympics
Polish male sport wrestlers
Olympic bronze medalists for Poland
People from Rzeszów
Olympic medalists in wrestling
Sportspeople from Podkarpackie Voivodeship
Medalists at the 1980 Summer Olympics
20th-century Polish people
21st-century Polish people